Trilok Singh Chitarkar (1914-1990) was a versatile Indian painter. He has unique style of presenting himself through variety of themes - Sikh religion, history, culture, folk lore, love legends, portraits, social evils, nature, illustration of Gurbani, Shabads, visuals in Punjabi Encyclopedia and books. He was well versed with deep knowledge of Gurbani, history and religion. He knew many languages i.e. Gurmukhi, Punjabi, Hindi, English, Urdu, Persian, Assamese and Bengali. He translated articles from Bengali to Punjabi and published these in the book titled Bangla De Daab in 1974. The Artist was honoured in 1973 by the Chief Minister, Punjab,India  Giani Zail Singh at a state level function organised at his residence, Chitralok, Patiala. Language department, Punjab published a book in Punjabi-Chitralok's Contribution to Art and released on the 70th birthday of the artist, December 10, 1984 at a special function organised in Central Library at Patiala for  his contribution to Art.
He is the first Punjabi Artist on whose works Ph.D. degree Art of Trilok Singh was awarded by Punjabi University, Patiala. A Gold medal has been established in the name of the artist and it is awarded to the topper of M.A. Fine Arts. He was appointed as a State Artist in erstwhile PEPSU state of Punjab in 1948 and later worked as Artist in Department of Languages, Punjab. He lived and worked all over India and spent last years of his life in Patiala town in Punjab state in India.

Biography

Early life
Trilok Singh was born in village Jartauli, District Ludhiana to father Gurdit Singh and mother Daya Kaur. He was married to Harbans Kaur and has one daughter and three sons.

His father was a civil engineer by profession, who worked in the Uganda Railway, Cape Government Railways, South African Republic and then in East Bengal Railways at Assam. His mother passed away during his childhood and he spent his childhood in Jartauli under the supervision of his grandfather Baba Daya Singh.His grandfather's knowledge of Gurbani was a boon and blessing for him beyond limits. The artist always felt that his success in life and art is only due to good training, blessing, motivation of his grandfather. He was studying in 10th class in a school at Kila Raipur, District Ludhiana when his grandfather died.

Education and training
In 1930, his father took him to Assam and gave him the responsibility to prepare land for agriculture purpose. He lived in Punjabi Basti in Lanka, District Nawgong, Assam. The natural beauty of Assam attracted him. In his free time he enjoyed drawing the nature. His creative genius arose from within and he start drawing and painting. His father thought of famous Artist S.G. Thakur Singh who was in Calcutta at that time. His father sent drawings to the artist to know whether his son would be successful in the field of art. On getting positive response. His father sent him to Calcutta in 1931 to take further professional guidance in art. He started working hard to learn. Once when Artist S.G. Thakur Singh came to know that his father has sent him money, he scolded him and advised him saying he has no right to ask for money from his father, rather he should earn money and send to his father.

Painting career
In 1932, the artist set up Trilok Studio Arts (TSA) and named it Trilok Shilpa Asthan and on other side a car paint workshop situated at 7, Ashutosh Mukherjee Road in Calcutta. Shortly, it became very popular.  He often spent time with Punjabi poets, writers and Bengali artists. The first biographical detail of Trilok Singh was published in 1932 in a monthly Punjabi magazine of Calcutta Pulwari by the editor Heera Singh Dard. He got silver medal for his painting in All India Ramgharia Federation, Kharagpur, Bengal in 1932. Next year, he participated in an exhibition of All India Fine Arts Association held in Calcutta. Picture of two famous Sikh artists Trilok Singh and S.G. Thakur Singh was published in special edition of Punjabi newspaper Desh Darpan, Calcutta on January 11, 1935 page 36.
 
In 1937, the artist with his family had to shift to Assam to look after his agricultural land as his father was very sick.There he designed an appliance attached to cart for automatic rice plantation which was pulled with a pair of bulls. It was known as 'Dhan Roopa Kala'. He helped his father in agriculture and also opened Art Studio  Navrang in Nowgong. In 1938, two paintings -Mahatma Gandhi and  Subhas Chandra Bose - were prepared and sent to Congress session at Haripur in Assam. He welcomed Jawaharlal Nehru at Chhaparmukh railway station, Assam and garlanded him. Next day, he attended the session and presented Pt. Nehru his painting on patriotism. While receiving it, Nehru said you are very useful artist to our country. In 1938, Sh. Gopinath Bordoloi formed the government in Assam. In 1939, the artist completed the painting ‘Mother India with flambeau’ showing his patriotic feelings.
   
After the death of his father, the responsibility of agricultural land and his profession fell on his shoulders. Suddenly, his son Surjit Singh fell sick and he took his son to Shillong for a change of climate. It was a very hard time for Trilok Singh. The health of his son was deteriorating day by day. He got his son admitted in The Hills Welsh Mission Hospital (Dr. H. Gordon Roberts Hospital, Shillong). To meet medical expenses, he started going to military base, prepared pencil sketches, portraits of soldiers, took photographs & developed in box camera fitted on his bicycle. He prepared a painting of Jesus Christ blessing the hospital and gifted it to the hospital on Christmas when his son recovered. Dr. Hughes Gordon Robert, Welsh Presbyterian Mission and founder of the hospital thanked the artist for the beautiful gift vide his letter Ref.no 239 dated December 29, 1941. As a mark of blessings of Almighty, he started study of Guru Nanak's life and preparing it on canvas. He ran Art and Photography studio 'Navrang' in Shillong for two years. He was blessed with second child, a daughter 'Jagdish Kaur'.

Return to the Punjab
In 1944, he shifted back to his native village Jartaulli in Punjab. He came in contact with Bhai Sahib Bhai Randhir Singh who lived in Village Narangwal about 2 km from his residence. He prepared painting of Bhai Randhir Singh who stood before him.Bhai Randhir Singh himself honoured him with Siropa, Rs125/- as token of love. Bhai Sahib advised him to prepare painting of Guru Gobind Singh. To make the painting, he travelled to Anandpur Sahib, Privar Vichora, Bhatha Sahib, Chamkaur Sahib, Machhiwara, Alamgir on his bicycle to understand the nature of that area. Bhai Sahib happily received the painting of Guru Gobind Singh. He met S. Hardarshan Singh Jeji in 1945 in Patiala and handed over Bhai Sahib's letter. He also met Maharaja of Patiala with the painting. He also visited Delhi on April 14, 1946 and met Congress leaders Pandit Nehru, Asif Ali and others. With due advise from Bhai Sahib, he joined as instructor in paint workshop at 117 E.T.C. military training center, Meerut cantonment Meerut. He worked there for two years. India got independence in 1947.

Later career
Trilok Singh was adjudged the best in painting competition held for the post of State Artist in Patiala & East Punjab States Union (PEPSU) and offered him the job. He joined on 8-06-1948. During this tenure, he was associated with art work of Rikanjat Secretariat, Punjabi and Archives department, Museum, Darbar Hall (Qilla Mubark).  Rai Sahib Ganga Singh, State Artist (PEPSU), Specialist in Drawing and Painting ( University College London) wrote about Trilok Singh on 29-03-1951 :- I have had the opportunity to examine his work several times, I always found that he is up to the mark. He is very strong in perspective drawing and making original designs, which in fact is the key of success in Fine Arts. His work that he has done in Darbar Hall (Qilla Mubark) during this period would speak the efficiency itself. ( original letter is with Jotinder Singh, Chitralok, Patiala). He worked on this post up to 31-03-1951.

In 1951, Trilok Singh joined Punjabi Mehkma (PEPSU) as artist (Chitarkar). Dr. Ganda Singh was holding the charge as Director of the department at that time. The artist was member of decoration committee of Assembly Hall, PEPSU. He designed illustrations of publications, portraits and preparation of four volumes of Mahankosh (Punjabi Encyclopedia) into one book. Till 1956, Punjabi Mehkma status was temporary one, the artist and Inder Singh Chakarvarti were instrumental in getting Punjabi Mehkma status as permanent from Raja Surendra Singh of Nalagarh State, finance minister, PEPSU. After the merger of PEPSU in Punjab on November 1, 1956 it became Language department, Punjab. He was member of Arts Study Center, Punjabi University, Patiala 1962–64. He was the life member of Indian Academy of Fine Arts, Amritsar and  Chandigarh Lalit Kala Akademi. His retirement was due in 1972 but Punjab Govt. gave him extension of two years. After retirement, he devoted his time to art and illustrated the messages of Gurbani though his paintings.

Last days at Patiala
Jotinder Singh youngest son of the artist, was living and looking after them. Wife of the artist left for heavenly abode on June 6, 1990. The Artist wrote his will on July 13, 1990 that he will continue to dedicate himself to art work and his son Jotinder Singh will be the owner of all his works thereafter. He also wrote in the Will that his son looked after them like Gurdev Mata and Gurdev Pita and takes care of his works with love and devotion.

He completed his last painting a day before his death. He was honoured for his contribution to art at Ludhiana two days before his death i.e. December 9, 1990.

Last day. On December 11, 1990, he got ready in morning as usual and asked his son to take his photograph before leaving for Delhi. Then he went to Municipal committee for street work and became unconscious sitting with Executive Officer. They immediately took him to Rajindra Hospital. Doctors declared him dead. Harpal Kaur w/o Jotinder Singh went to the hospital and brought his body. The last day photograph has been fixed on title page of Ph.D research thesis - Art of Trilok Singh.

The artist always felt that life is too short, there is still lot is to be done. He devoted 58 years of his life in the field of art.

Awards and honors
Then Chief Minister of Punjab Giani Zail Singh had inaugurated his Art Gallery Chitralok, Patiala in year 1973 and also named a street as Chitra-Lok Marg after him.

Punjabi University has instituted an award Sardar Trilok Singh Chitarkar Gold Medal  in the memory of painter, which is conferred annually to university topper of M.A. Fine Art. One researcher has been awarded Ph.D. degree by Punjabi University on critical work of this single painter's work. He was mentioned in various research articles, theses and books about Painters of Punjab. One book titled Chitralok's contribution to Art has been published in Punjabi language by Department of Languages, Punjab in year 1984.

Many Punjabi newspapers share stories about the inspiring works of this artist. The painting exhibitions of this painter have been held frequently all around the Punjab.

Paintings
Being a very religious person, his knowledge about sikh religion is reflected in all his paintings. During initial days of his career, his works mostly focused towards freedom struggle of India and Patriotism. Later on his works represented teachings of Guru Granth Sahib. He also prepared illustrations of many books including Guru Gobind Singh Marg, while working with Punjab Language deptt. These original paintings by Trilok Singh Chitarkar are on display in Chitralok Art Gallery, Patiala.

Pre Independence works (1933 to 1947)

Post Independence works (1948 to 1990) 
He worked on variety of themes. Some of his works are presented in following categories:-
 Love legends-

Womenhood

Landscape

Punjabi Encyclopedia - Trilok Singh is the only Artist who made illustrations for Punjabi encyclopedia and published by Languages department, Punjab 

Punjabi Culture-

Development of Gurmukhi (Punjabi) script from 375 AD

Poetry

Paintings based on Gurbani-

Portraits  

Historical-

Punjabi alphabets - comparative Hindi and Bengali alphabets

Contribution to Hindi

Legacy
The Artist left for  heavenly abode on December 11, 1990. His youngest son  Jotinder Singh and his family was living with his father and took care of him.  He was looking after the Artist’s paintings and other works  with very much care and love. Jotinder Singh did the last rites of his father.  As per the registered Will executed by the Artist, Jotinder Singh became the sole owner of his father’s works. Both brothers went  to court that the registered Will is false but the court ordered that the registered Will is the genuine one. Jotinder Singh is maintaining  and preserving the works of his father with due care.

1991- On-the- spot competition started in 1991 every year in the month of May for school children of Patiala. Children are being provided with awards in the memory of Artist Trilok Singh.

1992- Art section of 52nd All India Sikh Educational Conference held at Patiala in 1992 was dedicated to late S. Trilok Singh Artist. The works  of the Artist were exhibited for 3 days. This exhibition was inaugurated by S. Gurcharan Singh Tohra, President, SGPC , Amritsar and Principal S.Satbir Singh.

1994- Painting Exhibition of the Artist was held in Yamunanagar ( HR ) in 1994. The Exhibition was inaugurated by the minister of educations , Haryana. They honoured the Artist’s son Jotinder Singh.

1995- North Zone Cultural  Center, Government of India, Patiala made a documentary film ‘ Great master of North Zone - S. Trilok Singh Chitarkar’.

2001- Research work was done on the  works of the Artist named ‘ Art of Trilok Singh’ for Doctor of Philosophy in Fine Arts by Saroj Kumari Sharma, Director, Museum and Art Gallery, Department of Fine Arts, Punjabi University, Patiala under the guidance of Dr Saroj Chaman.

2004- A Gold medal in the name of S.Trilok Singh Artist set up  for the topper of M.A Fine Arts. On this occasion S. Swarn Singh Boparai , Kirti Chakra Padma Shri , Vice Chancellor , Punjabi University, Patiala and Er. Jotinder Singh son of the Artist and other dignitaries were present.

2005- Painting exhibition was held at Bathinda in December 2005 and dedicated to S. Trilok Singh Artist.

2006- A SPIRITUAL GLOW an exhibition of paintings based on the verses of Gurbani by late S. Trilok Singh Artist was held in Museum and Art Gallery, Punjabi University, Patiala. It was inaugurated by S. Swaran Singh Boparai, Kirti Chakra, Padam Shree (Awardee), vice Chancellor, Punjabi University, Patiala, Punjab. This exhibition remained  open from December 19 to December 22, 2006.

10-12-2014- on 100th birthday of the Artist, Jotinder Singh with his wife visited Sri Harmandar Sahib, Amritsar. With the blessing of Almighty, web www.triloksinghartist.com was launched.

2017- work prepared by the Artist was published by Bihar government in Coffee books in Punjabi and English on 350th. Prakash Purv celebrations of Guru Gobind Singh. it is also printed courtesy - Jotinder Singh Engr-in Chief/Retd., Chitralok, Patiala ( www.triloksinghartist.com).

2019- Painting  exhibition on the verses of Guru Nanak by Trilok Singh Artist was arranged by Punjabi University, Patiala on 550th. Prakash Purv of Guru Nanak Dev ji. Punjabi University published and released a catalogue in honour of S. Trilok Singh Artist on 13th. August 2019 in Senate hall by Vice Chancellor Dr. BS Ghuman. The exhibition was held in Museum and Art Gallery, Punjabi University, Patiala from August 13- August 20, 2019.  Prominent personalities were  present at the time of inauguration Dr. & Gurmit Singh Sidhu, Prof. & Head,  Guru Gobind Singh Chair, Punjabi University, Dr. Balkar Singh, Director, World Punjabi Center, S. Ujagar Singh ex DPRO, S. Jagjit Singh Dardi Chairman, Chardikala group. S. Badungar former President - SGPC, Amritsar.

2020- A book Guru Gobind Singh Marg as visualised by Artist Trilok Singh was published. This book is having Guru Gobind Singh Marg prepared by S. Trilok Singh from Anandpur Sahib to Talwandi Sabo. The paintings of the Artist related to the Marg are also included in the book.

References

External links
Detailed biography
Review about Artist and Life Sketch of Trilok Singh Artist

Indian Sikhs
1914 births
1990 deaths
People from Patiala
Punjabi people
20th-century Indian painters
Indian male painters
Painters from Punjab, India